Maria Patek (born 13 July 1958) is an Austrian civil servant who served as the Minister for Sustainability and Tourism in the Bierlein government.

Life 

Maria Patek was born in 1958 in rural Michaelerberg, Styria. Her career in the Austrian agriculture ministry began in 1983. She rose through the ranks and in 2018 was responsible for the Forestry and Sustainability Section. She is married with two daughters.

In 2015 Patek was awarded a Grand Decoration of Honour in Silver for Services to the Republic of Austria. She was sworn in as Minister for Sustainability and Tourism in the interim government of Brigitte Bierlein on 3 June 2019.

References 

1958 births
Living people
People from Styria
Agriculture ministers of Austria
Women government ministers of Austria
21st-century Austrian women politicians
21st-century Austrian politicians